J. D. Thottan (23 February 1922 – 23 September 1997) was an Indian director of Malayalam language films. Indian Cinema cited him along with M. Krishnan Nair, S. S. Rajan, and A. B. Raj as one of the Malayalam film industry's successful film directors.

Films
He directed films such as Sthreehridayam (1960) and Karinizhal (1971).

Selected filmography
Koodappirappu (1956)
Chathurangam (1959)
Sthreehridayam (1960)
Kalyaana Photo (1964)
Sarpakadu (1965)
Anadha (1970)
Vivaaham Swargathil (1970)
Karinizhal (1971)
Gangaasangamam (1971)
Vivaahasammanam (1971)
Omana (1972)
Check Post (1974)
Nurayum Pathayum (1977)
Athirthikal (1988)

References

External links

20th-century Indian film directors
Malayalam film directors
Malayalam screenwriters
Year of birth missing